The 1994–95 season of the NOFV-Oberliga was the first season of the league at tier four (IV) of the German football league system after the reintroduction of the Fußball-Regionalliga. This was the last season where the 2-points-for-a-win rule was used in Germany.

The NOFV-Oberliga was split into two divisions, NOFV-Oberliga Nord and NOFV-Oberliga Süd. The champions of each, FSV 90 Velten and FSV Wacker 90 Nordhausen, were directly promoted to the 1995–96 Regionalliga Nordost.

North

South

External links 
 NOFV-Online – official website of the North-East German Football Association 

NOFV-Oberliga seasons
4
Germ